Wisteria is a genus of flowering plants in the legume family, Fabaceae (Leguminosae). The genus includes four species of woody twining vines that are native to China, Japan, Korea, Vietnam, southern Canada, the Eastern United States, and north of Iran. They were later introduced to France, Germany and various other countries in Europe. Some species are popular ornamental plants. The genus name is also used as the English name, and may then be spelt 'wistaria'. In some countries in Western and Central Europe, Wisteria is also known by a variant spelling of the genus in which species were formerly placed, Glycine. Examples include the French glycines, the German Glyzinie, and the Polish glicynia.

The aquatic flowering plant commonly called wisteria or 'water wisteria' is Hygrophila difformis, in the family Acanthaceae.

Description

Wisterias climb by twining their stems around any available support. W. floribunda (Japanese wisteria) twines clockwise when viewed from above, while W. sinensis (Chinese wisteria)  twines counterclockwise. This is an aid in identifying the two most common species of wisteria. Planted in 1894, it is of the 'Chinese lavender' variety.

The leaves are alternate, 15 to 35 cm long, pinnate, with 9 to 19 leaflets. 

The flowers have drooping racemes that vary in length from species to species. W. frutescens (American wisteria) has the shortest racemes, . The flowers come in a variety of colors, including white, lilac, purple, and pink, and some W. brachybotrys (Silky wisteria) and W. floribunda cultivars have particularly remarkable colors. The flowers are fragrant, and especially cultivars of W. brachybotrys, W. floribunda, and W. sinensis are noted for their sweet and musky scents. Flowering is in spring (just before or as the leaves open) in some Asian species, and in mid to late summer in the American species.

Taxonomy

The genus Wisteria was established by Thomas Nuttall in 1818. He based the genus on Wisteria frutescens, previously included in the genus Glycine. Nuttall stated that he named the genus in memory of the American physician and anatomist Caspar Wistar (1761–1818). Both men were living in Philadelphia at the time, where Wistar was a professor in the School of Medicine at the University of Pennsylvania. Questioned about the spelling later, Nuttall said it was for "euphony", but his biographer speculated that it may have something to do with Nuttall's friend Charles Jones Wister Sr., of Grumblethorpe, the grandson of the merchant John Wister. Various sources assert that the naming occurred in Philadelphia. It has been suggested that the Portuguese botanist and geologist José Francisco Corrêa da Serra, who lived in Philadelphia beginning in 1812, four years before his appointment as ambassador of Portugal to the United States, and a friend of Wistar, proposed the name "Wistaria" in his obituary of Wistar.

As the spelling is apparently deliberate, there is no justification for changing the genus name under the International Code of Nomenclature for algae, fungi, and plants.

Classification
The genus was previously placed in the tribe Millettieae. Molecular phylogenetic studies from 2000 onwards showed that Wisteria, along with other genera such as Callerya and Afgekia, were related and quite distinct from other members of the Millettieae. A more detailed study in 2019 reached the same conclusion, and moved Wisteria to the expanded tribe Wisterieae.

Species

, Plants of the World Online accepted four species:

Ecology
Wisteria species are used as food plants by the larvae of some Lepidoptera species including brown-tail moth.

Toxicity
The seeds are produced in pods similar to those of Laburnum, and, like the seeds of that genus, are poisonous. All parts of the plant contain a saponin called wisterin, which is toxic if ingested, and may cause dizziness, confusion, speech problems, nausea, vomiting, stomach pains, diarrhea and collapse. There is debate over whether the concentration outside of the seeds is sufficient to cause poisoning. Wisteria seeds have caused poisoning in children and pets of many countries, producing mild to severe gastroenteritis and other effects.

Cultivation

In North America, W. floribunda (Japanese wisteria) and W. sinensis (Chinese wisteria) are far more popular than other species for their abundance of flowers, clusters of large flowers, variety of flower colors, and fragrance. W. sinensis was brought to the United States for horticultural purposes in 1816, while W. floribunda was introduced around 1830. Because of their hardiness and tendency to escape cultivation, these non-native wisterias are considered invasive species in many parts of the U.S., especially the Southeast, due to their ability to overtake and choke out other native plant species.

W. floribunda (Japanese wisteria), which has the longest racemes of wisteria species, is decorative and has given rise to many cultivars that have won the prestigious Award of Garden Merit.

Wisteria, especially W. sinensis (Chinese wisteria), is very hardy and fast-growing. It can grow in fairly poor-quality soils, but prefers fertile, moist, well-drained soil. It thrives in full sun. It can be propagated via hardwood cutting, softwood cuttings, or seed. However, specimens grown from seed can take decades to bloom; for this reason, gardeners usually grow plants that have been started from rooted cuttings or grafted cultivars known to flower well.

Another reason for failure to bloom can be excessive fertilizer (particularly nitrogen). Wisteria has nitrogen fixing capability (provided by Rhizobia bacteria in root nodules), and thus mature plants may benefit from added potassium and phosphate, but not nitrogen. Finally, wisteria can be reluctant to bloom before it has reached maturity. Maturation may require only a few years, as in W. macrostachya (Kentucky wisteria), or nearly twenty, as in W. sinensis. Maturation can be forced by physically abusing the main trunk, root pruning, or drought stress.

Wisteria can grow into a mound when unsupported, but is at its best when allowed to clamber up a tree, pergola, wall, or other supporting structure. If you want wisteria to grow along the pergola, W. floribunda (Japanese wisteria) with longer racemes is the best choice. If you want wisteria to grow along the wall, W. sinensis (Chinese wisteria) with shorter racemes is the best choice. Whatever the case, the support must be very sturdy, because mature wisteria can become immensely strong with heavy wrist-thick trunks and stems. These can collapse latticework, crush thin wooden posts, and even strangle large trees. Wisteria allowed to grow on houses can cause damage to gutters, downspouts, and similar structures. Wisteria flowers develop in buds near the base of the previous year's growth, so pruning back side shoots to the basal few buds in early spring can enhance the visibility of the flowers. Once the plant is a few years old, a relatively compact, free-flowering form can be achieved by pruning off the new tendrils three times during the growing season in the summer months. The flowers of some varieties are edible, and can even be used to make wine. Others are said to be toxic. Careful identification by an expert is strongly recommended before consuming this or any wild plant.

In the United Kingdom, the national collection of wisteria is held by Chris Lane at the Witch Hazel Nursery in Newington, near Sittingbourne in Kent.

Art and symbolism

Wisteria and their racemes have been widely used in Japan throughout the centuries and were a popular symbol in family crests and heraldry. One popular dance in kabuki known as the Fuji Musume (or 'The Wisteria Maiden'), is the sole extant dance of a series of five personifying dances in which a maiden becomes the embodiment of the spirit of wisteria. In the West, both in building materials such as tile, as well as stained glass, wisterias have been used both in realism and stylistically in artistic works and industrial design.

References

External links
Ohio State University fact sheet on wisteria

 
Fabaceae genera
Vines
Poisonous plants